The Golden Helmet of Coțofenești (pronounced /kotsofeneʃti/) is a Geto-Dacian helmet dating from the first half of the 4th century BC.

In 1929, a child named Traian Simion uncovered the helmet by chance on the territory of the village of Poiana Coțofenești (now called Poiana Vărbilău), Prahova County, Romania, in the location called "Vârful Fundăturii".

Thereupon, Ioan Andrieșescu, professor of Prehistory at the University of Bucharest, conducted a thorough investigation at the site. The team of archaeologists noticed that helmet was not part of a gold treasure or grave but it was part of a local Geto-Dacian La Tène settlement. Archaeologists concluded that the helmet was a stray find, as only a few late Hallstatt pottery fragments were found, some of them wheeled. The helmet is kept at the National History Museum of Romania (inv 11420).

Analysis

Almost a kilogram heavy, the gold helmet is very well preserved, missing only the part of its skull cap. The form of the helmet and its decorations reveal the autochthonous character of this Geto-Dacian artwork. The helmet is decorated with large studs on the top of the skull and two very large apotropaic eyes, meant to ward off the evil eye and magic spells. It was established that it belonged to an unknown local Geto-Dacian king or to a local aristocratic noble, from around year 400 BC. One theory — without any proof, however — is that this item was the sacred helmet of Zalmoxis, the living god-prophet of the Dacians.

Helmet decorations depict a range of mythical creatures, and  an illustration, on either cheek-piece, of a ritual enactment.

The cheek-pieces of the Poiana-Coțofenești helmet show a ram being sacrificed by a man who kneels on its body and is about to cut its throat with a short knife. The iconography on the right side of the helmet is of a great interest, and has been interpreted in light of the tauroctony scene from the Mithraic Mysteries. Environment and affluence might well account for a change to a larger beast in the species offered and a similar interpretation of a bull-slaying episode. This  sacrifice of the ram might have been performed by the "king-priest-god".

The pair of Voracious Beasts on the Coțofenești neck-guard occupy a lower register along with a similar creature deprived of a victim’s leg.
This motif of the "Voracious Beast" is found earlier in Assyrian art, and was popular among the Etruscans. Phoenicia was probably the intermediary for its transferral to Italy and around the Adriatic, but Voracious Beast must also have traveled through Asia Minor to appear in a North Thracian idiom not only on the Coțofenești neck-guard but also in high relief on the base of the Aghighiol beakers (Aghighiol is a village near the Danube Delta in eastern Romania).

The upper register displays a row of three seated or squatting winged creatures, rather monkey-like with human faces, long forearms, and long tails. These, however, are surely direct, if run-down, descendants of the sphinxes on a gold beaker from Amlash .

The eyes on a Greek battle-shield may be designated to ward off evil blows, but once translated onto a helmet, and above the eyes of a North Thracian noble who wore it, could mean "I see twice as well, I have eyes like my hawk". The Thracian gold and silversmiths who manufactured the objects were aware of other contemporary art styles — those of Scythia, Greece, northeast Italy, and now modern Slovenia were known through trade, travel and meetings — and they adapted conventions of representation suitable for their own purposes. The meaning of these motifs was no doubt context-specific.

The decorations such as rosette, strips, triangles, spiral and others are specific Geto-Dacian art motifs. The scene of sacrifice the ram is an oriental Iranian theme that entered in the Greek art and from there in the ‘barbarian’ art. Therefore, the helmet seems to have been realized in a Greek workshop. But, in the same time the awkward technique of execution that contrasts with the perfect technique of a Greek craftsman points out to an autochthonous one.

In popular culture

A replica of the helmet appeared in the 1967 historical movie Dacii (The Dacians) by Sergiu Nicolaescu, though it took place at least 500 years after the period to which the helmet has been dated. Worn by the Dacian king Decebalus, the movie helmet had a flat top, an inaccuracy that entered the vernacular of popular culture. The comic strips "Din zori de istorie", published in late 1970s in "Cutezătorii" magazine, written by Vasile Mănuceanu and drawn by Albin Stănescu, also depicts the helmet with a flat top. It is worn by the Getian king Odrix during the conflict with the Persian king Darius I, who in 513 BC was campaigning against the Scythians. The action takes place within roughly the period that produced the original helmet. A similar comic strip written by Mănuceanu and drawn by Sandu Florea depicts the king Burebista wearing the helmet as well.

See also 
 Getae

Notes

References

Modern

External links 

 Archaeology at Coțofenești - cIMeC' Digital Archives of Archaeology
 Synthesis of the monography of Dumbrăvești commune  - Includes a detailed account of the discovery
 Article on the helmet  
 Helmet in the comic strips "Din zori de istorie", published in "Cutezătorii" magazine 
 The helmet in 3D by 88millimeters
 Gold and Silver Armour of the Getian-Dacian Elite. Military Equipment and Organization.
 Thracian beaker with birds and animals at the Metropolitan Museum of Art

4th century BC in Romania
4th-century BC works
1929 archaeological discoveries
Archaeological discoveries in Romania
Dacian culture
Ancient helmets
Thracian archaeological artifacts
Dacian weapons
Individual helmets